SUFE may refer to:

Institutions 

Shanghai University of Finance and Economics

Medicine 

Slipped Upper Femoral Epiphysis also known as Slipped Capital Femoral Epiphysis

Organisations 
Stand Up For Europe, a eurofederalist political organisation